Yohannan I bar Marta was patriarch of the Church of the East between 680 and 683.

Sources 
Brief accounts of Yohannan's patriarchate are given in the Ecclesiastical Chronicle of the Jacobite writer Bar Hebraeus (floruit 1280) and in the ecclesiastical histories of the Nestorian writers Mari (twelfth-century), Amr (fourteenth-century) and Sliba (fourteenth-century).

Yohannan's patriarchate 
The following account of Yohannan's patriarchate is given by Mari:

Yohannan, also known as Bar Marta, came from a noble family of al-Ahwaz, and was educated in the school of Jundishapur.  He later became metropolitan of Jundishapur, and was shortly afterwards elected patriarch.  He was consecrated in al-Madaïn in the usual way.  His health was very poor, and he died after sitting for only two years and a few days.  He was buried in Mattuth.

A few more details are supplied by Bar Hebraeus:

At this period the catholicus Giwargis died and was succeeded by Yohannan Bar Marta, in the second year of Yazid, son of Muawiya, the king of the Arabs who ruled in Palestine.  Yohannan was already old and bowed down in years, and subject to infirmities.  After he had fulfilled his office for two years, he died and was succeeded by Hnanisho the Great.

See also
 List of patriarchs of the Church of the East

Notes

References
 Abbeloos, J. B., and Lamy, T. J., Bar Hebraeus, Chronicon Ecclesiasticum (3 vols, Paris, 1877)
 Assemani, J. A., De Catholicis seu Patriarchis Chaldaeorum et Nestorianorum (Rome, 1775)
 Brooks, E. W., Eliae Metropolitae Nisibeni Opus Chronologicum (Rome, 1910)
 Gismondi, H., Maris, Amri, et Salibae: De Patriarchis Nestorianorum Commentaria I: Amri et Salibae Textus (Rome, 1896)
 Gismondi, H., Maris, Amri, et Salibae: De Patriarchis Nestorianorum Commentaria II: Maris textus arabicus et versio Latina (Rome, 1899)

External links 

7th-century bishops of the Church of the East
7th-century deaths
Patriarchs of the Church of the East
Year of birth unknown
Nestorians